Mniophila muscorum is a species of Chrysomelid in the sub-family Galerucinae, that can be found nearly everywhere in Southern Northern Europe , Central Europe and East Europe and also in Italy it is not recorded in Turkey or the Caucasus
and it is doubtfully recorded in Spain

References

Beetles described in 1803
Alticini
Taxa named by Wilhelm Daniel Joseph Koch